= 1924–25 Plunket Shield season =

Cricket tournament in New Zealand

1924–25 Plunket Shield
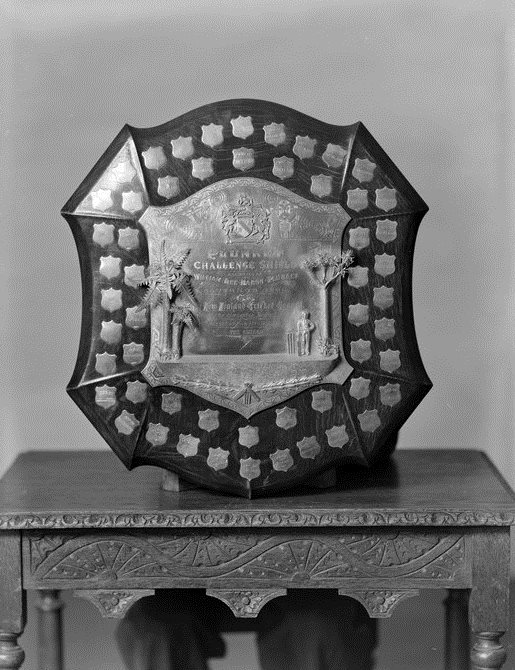
- The Plunket Shield trophy
- Cricket format: First-class
- Tournament format(s): Round-robin
- Champions: Otago (1st title)
- Participants: 4
- Matches: 6

The 1924–25 Plunket Shield season was a tournament of the Plunket Shield, the domestic first-class cricket competition of New Zealand.

Otago won the championship, finishing at the top of the points table at the end of the round-robin tournament between four first-class sides, Auckland, Canterbury, Otago and Wellington.

== Table ==
Below are the Plunket Shield standings for the season:

Team	Played	Won	Lost	Abnd	NetRpW
Otago	3	2	1	0	5.836
Canterbury	3	2	1	0	3.689
Wellington	2	1	1	1	-1.433
Auckland	2	0	2	1	-12.200
